Prof. Brij Kishore Kuthiala is chairman of Haryana State Higher Education Council. He has also served as Vice-Chancellor, Makhanlal Chaturvedi National University of Journalism and Communication, Bhopal. He has been conferred Honorary D.Litt. by Maharshi Dayanand University. He is trained at Film & Television Institute of India, Pune and Indian Institute of Mass Communication, New Delhi. He is trustee of Bharatiya Chitra Sadhna.

Book
 Makhan Lal Chaturvedi: Hindi ke Ananya Sewak.

References

1948 births
Living people
Academic staff of Kurukshetra University
20th-century Indian educational theorists
Writers from Haryana
20th-century Indian educators
Scholars from Haryana
Heads of universities and colleges in India